The Medal for Rescue at Sea is a Norwegian award was instituted by Royal Decree on 25 August 1978. It ranks as number 14 in the order of precedence of the Orders, decorations, and medals of Norway.

Award distribution
The medal is awarded by the Ministry of Trade and Industry, on the recommendation of the Norwegian Maritime Directorate.  Individuals who have demonstrated courage, resourcefulness and skill for the saving of life at sea, are eligible for this award.

Design
The Medal for Rescue at Sea is made of silver.  The obverse shows the Coat of arms of Norway surrounded by the inscription "Kongeriket Norge" (Kingdom of Norway). On the reverse edge is the inscription "For Redningsdåd til Sjøs" (For Rescue at Sea) at the top with an oak wreath below. The medal is suspended from a ribbon of red with a white edged blue stripe in the middle, like the flag of Norway.

References

Civil awards and decorations of Norway
Awards established in 1978
1978 establishments in Norway